Arthur Cyril Bateman (30 October 1890 – 28 March 1918) was an Irish cricketer. A right-handed batsman, he played two first-class matches for Ireland, one in 1913, the other in 1914. Both were against Scotland.

Whilst fighting in the First World War, he was declared missing, presumed dead on 28 March 1918 near the town of Arras, France.

References

External links
CricketEurope profile

1890 births
1918 deaths
Irish cricketers
Sportspeople from County Cavan
British military personnel killed in World War I
British Army personnel of World War I
Royal Army Medical Corps officers
Missing in action of World War I
Missing person cases in France